Arthur Hughes MC (25 October 1885 – 1 February 1968) was an Australian politician.

He was born in Broomfield to miner David Solomon Hughes and Esther Vickers. He was a schoolteacher in Ballarat, and during World War I served with the Australian Imperial Force in Egypt and France; wounded in 1916, he was invalided home and awarded the Military Cross. A Labor Party member, he was active in the campaign against military conscription. After the war, he was a soldier settler at Newlyn, and in 1921 he was elected to the Victorian Legislative Assembly as the Labor member for Grenville. He transferred to Hampden in 1927, but was defeated in 1929. In 1932, he left the Labor Party, feeling that it was insufficiently anti-communist. Hughes died in Ballarat in 1968.

References

1885 births
1968 deaths
Australian Army officers
Australian Labor Party members of the Parliament of Victoria
Australian military personnel of World War I
Australian Army personnel of World War II
Australian recipients of the Military Cross
Members of the Victorian Legislative Assembly
20th-century Australian politicians